Cladosporium oncobae is a fungus.

References 

Cladosporium
Fungal plant pathogens and diseases
Fungi described in 2006